Vincenzo Caianiello (2 October 1932 – 26 April 2002) was an Italian jurist, member of the Constitutional Court of Italy from  October 23, 1986 to October 23, 1995.

Born in Aversa, Campania, he was the president of the Constitutional Court from September 9, 1995 to the end of his term in office. His term was the shortest of any president of the Court. In January 1996 he became Minister of Justice in Lamberto Dini's government and resigned from office in May of same year.

Caianiello died in Rome in 2002.

1932 births
2002 deaths
People from Aversa
Italian jurists
Italian Ministers of Justice
Judges of the Constitutional Court of Italy
Presidents of the Constitutional Court of Italy
20th-century jurists